Dan Locklair (born 1949) is an American composer. He holds the position of Composer-in-Residence at Wake Forest University in Winston-Salem, North Carolina where he is also a Professor of Music.  Locklair has written numerous works ranging from organ solos to compositions for full orchestra, but he is most often noted for his sacred music.

Locklair was born in Charlotte, North Carolina in 1949. He was a professional organist by age 14; he is a graduate of Mars Hill College and also holds a Doctor of Musical Arts degree from the Eastman School of Music.

One of Locklair's pieces, "The Peace may be exchanged" (from Rubrics), was performed at the funeral service for former President Ronald Reagan at the Washington National Cathedral.

Selected Compositions 

 Rubrics
 Phoenix and Again (1984), overture for orchestra, commissioned by Wake Forest University for its sesquicentennial, premiered 1984 by the Winston-Salem Symphony Orchestra.

References

External links
Official Dan Locklair Website

1949 births
American male composers
21st-century American composers
Wake Forest University faculty
Mars Hill University alumni
Eastman School of Music alumni
Living people
21st-century American male musicians
20th-century American composers
20th-century American male musicians
Musicians from Charlotte, North Carolina